Tufa Shujineng's Rebellion, also known as the Qin and Liang Provinces Rebellion (Chinese: 秦涼之變), was a tribal revolt against the Western Jin dynasty from 270 to 279 during the Three Kingdoms period. The revolt, led by the Xianbei chieftain, Tufa Shujineng but mostly consisting of the Qiang and Di people, first broke out in Qin province before spilling over to Liang province. It lasted around a decade, and was a factor in delaying Jin's conquest of Wu to unify China. The rebellion peaked in 279, when the rebels captured Liang, but that year would also see its end after Jin forces decisively defeated and kill Shujineng.

Background 
When the Cao Wei general, Deng Ai, was stationed in the northwest between 256 and 263, he received the surrender of tens of thousands of Xianbei people from the Hexi Corridor. He resettled them in the areas between Liang and Yong provinces, where they mingled with the local inhabitants. At the time, the two provinces were home to many non-Han people, most of whom were of Qiang or Di ethnicity. In 269, the Jin dynasty established Qin province, which included portions of Liang and Yong.

Between 268 and 269, many parts of China were affected by floods and droughts, and the Jin minister, Fu Xuan was worried that the tribal people in the northwest, particularly the Xianbei, would rebel as a result. He proposed that the Inspector of Qin, Hu Lie, who had a reputation in the west, be given responsibility to pacify the tribes in the case of a rebellion. However, he was still concern that even if Hu Lie defeated the rebels, the rebels could easily escape to Anding Commandery (安定郡; around present-day Pingliang, Gansu) in Yong or Wuwei Commandery (武威郡; in present-day Jingyuan County, Gansu) in Liang. He further suggested that a new commandery be set up around the river of Gaoping County (高平縣; present-day Guyuan, Ningxia), where those willing to migrate will be recruited and supplemented with corvée exemptions. The commandery, along with Anding and Wuwei, would be transferred to Qin for Hu Lie to administer. Fu Xuan also added that they should open up a new passage to the north to encourage people to migrate and gradually strengthen their hold around the border. 

However, one minister, Chen Qian had warned against appointing Hu Lie and another general, Qian Hong, as provincial inspectors. He argued that while the two were strong generals, they were both tactless and not suited to maintain order around the borders. However, his advice was ignored.

The rebellion

Early rebel success 
A rebellion soon broke out in Qin in June or July 270 after Hu Lie lost the support of the tribes. The rebellion's leader was Tufa Shujineng, the chieftain of the Tufa-Xianbei tribe fom Hexi. Although Shujineng was a Xianbei, historical records indicate that the rebels were made up of many different tribal groups, with most of them being Qiang and Di people. 

Hu Lie led his troops and camped at Wanhu Mound (萬斛堆; located in Gaolan County, Gansu) to campaign against Shujineng. However, Shujineng and the chieftains, Baihuwen (白虎文) and Yaolanni (藥蘭泥), surrounded Hu Lie's army and killed him. The Prince of Fufeng, Sima Liang, was supposed to send reinforcements to help Hu Lie through his subordinates Liu Qi (劉旂) and Jing Yan (敬琰), but the two refused to move their troops. Emperor Wu of Jin wanted to punish Liu Qi, but Sima Liang defended him and lost his post in the process. The Inspector of Liang, Su Yu, led forces who were also routed and killed by Shujineng at Mount Jin (金山; located in Shandan county, Gansu).

With the removal of Sima Liang, Emperor Wu sent the General Who Maintains the West, Shi Jian (石鑒) and Protector-General of Vehement Might, Tian Zheng (田章) to put down the revolt. Shi Jian ordered his subordinate, Du Yu, to attack Shujineng. However, Du Yu remonstrated with him, stating that the enemies were still in high spirits after their recent victories, as opposed to the demoralized Jin troops. He instead suggested that they wait until the following spring to attack, building up strength and storing up grains in the meantime. Shi Jian thought that Du Yu was trying to jeopardize the campaign, so he had Du Yu sent back to Luoyang in a prison cart for him to face the Minister of Justice. Shi Jian then carried out his original plans, but he could not defeat Shujineng. In September 270, Sima Jun was appointed Grand General Who Guards The West and Chief Controller of Yong, Liang and the other western provinces, and he was tasked in protecting the Guanzhong region.

In April or May 271, Shujineng was joined by the tribes of Beidi (北地; in present-day Qingyang, Gansu) in his invasion of Jincheng (金城; around present-day Yuzhong County, Gansu). The Inspector of Liang, Qian Hong, led his troops to fight Shujineng's forces, but the Qiang troops within Qian's army, dissatisfied by his mistreatment of them, rebelled and join Shujineng. Shujineng, Baihuwen and Yaolanni defeated and killed Qian Hong at Mount Qing (青山; located in Huan county, Gansu) after surrounding his army. Yang Xin was then made the new Inspector of Liang.

In 272, the Administrator of Dunhuang, Yin Qu (尹璩), died. Yang Xin petitioned that the Prefect of Dunhuang, Liang Cheng (梁澄), succeed to Yin Qu's office. However, an Officer of Merit, Song Zhi (宋質), deposed Liang Cheng and replaced him with the Consultant, Linghu Feng (令狐豐). Yang Xin led his soldiers to campaign against Linghu Feng, but he was defeated by Song Zhi's army.

Previously, Deng Ai had repaired paraphets and built many forts in Liang and Yong provinces for defensive purposes during his time. After Shujineng's rebellion broke out, many officials and local residents took refuge in these forts.

Reactions in Jin court 
The rebellion in Qin and Liang caused much worry for Emperor Wu. In 271, two of his ministers, Ren Kai (任愷) and Yu Chun (庾純), attempted to undermine their political enemy, Jia Chong, by recommending to Emperor Wu that he be sent to lead the fight against Shujineng. Emperor Wu agreed and even issued an edict appointing Jia Chong to the necessary positions. In the edict, it was stated in regard to the rebellion that, "Although we have faced attacks from Wu and Shu, never have we endured one to this extent." Jia Chong was distressed by Emperor Wu's decision, but with Xun Xu's help, he was able to remain in Luoyang after securing a marriage between his daughter, Jia Nanfeng, and Emperor Wu's heir, Sima Zhong. In 275, when the general, Yang Hu, submitted his petition advocating for the invasion of Jin's rival state, Eastern Wu, he was strongly opposed by Jia Chong and his partisans, who argued that quelling the rebellion in Qin and Liang should be of greater priority.

Jin counterattack 
After the failed attempts at quelling the rebellion, Sima Jun focused his soldiers on agriculture in Guanzhong. In 274, rebels from Liang attacked Jincheng again, but Sima Jun defeated them and killed one of their leaders, Qiwenni (乞文泥). In 275, Sima Jun campaigned against Shujineng and defeated his forces, killing 3,000 rebels. Later that year, when Sima Jun was ordered to lead 7,000 soldiers to strengthen the garrison in Liang, Shujineng, Houdanbo (侯彈勃) and their supporters planned to raid the military-agricultural colonies in Guanzhong. However, Sima Jun's subordinate, Wen Yang, led a combined force of troops from Liang, Qin and Yong to threaten Shujineng. Shujineng sent Houdanbo and twenty tribesmen to submit to Jin, each sending their sons as hostages. Wen Yang also received the surrender of 200,000 tribal people from Anding, Beidi and Jincheng including the chieftains Jikeluo (吉軻羅), Houjinduo (侯金多) and Rejiong (熱冏). Meanwhile, the Wu and Ji Colonel, Ma Xun (馬循), who was based in the Western Regions, campaigned against Xianbei rebels and killed their leader.

In 276, Linghu Feng died and was succeeded by his younger brother, Linghu Hong (令狐宏). Yang Xin launched another attack on Dunhuang, and this time, he killed Linghu Hong and recaptured the commandery. Afterwards, Sima Jun campaigned against the northern Hu (北胡) and killed one of their leaders, Tudun (吐敦). Later, a Xianbei leader, Aluoduo (阿羅多) attacked the Jin border. Ma Xun commanded his troops to defeat him, killing 4,000 and capturing 9,000 of them, which prompted Aluoduo to surrender. Near the end of the year, Sima Jun was promoted to Senior General Who Attacks the West.

Battle of Liang Province

Fall of Liang province 
Peace between Jin and Shujineng did not last, as Shujineng and the tribes revolted again in 277. He initially suffered another defeat to Wen Yang, but later that year, Sima Jun was recalled to the capital and replaced with Sima Tai (司馬泰) in Guanzhong. By 278, Yang Xin would also lose the tribes' support. That year, he fought with Shujineng's ally, Ruoluobaneng (若羅拔能) on the Dang Ranges (丹嶺) in Wuwei, but was defeated and beheaded. As Shujineng continued to harass Jin's borders, the Jin minister Li Xi (李憙) suggested that they send an army to defeat Shujineng, but the emperor's advisers disagreed, believing the situation was not as serious as Li thought. However, by the beginning of 279, Shujineng captured Liang. Emperor Wu regretted the situation to the point that records claim he was unable to eat until late in the evening.

Jin preparations 
The emperor's advisers initially considered sending the Jin general of Xiongnu ethnicity, Liu Yuan, to recapture the province, but decided not to out of fear that he would also rebel. Instead, a junior Jin general by the name of Ma Long volunteered to lead a Jin army and defeat Shujineng. Emperor Wu agreed and appointed him Protector-General Who Campaigns Against The Caitiffs and Administrator of Wuwei, despite objections from his minister. Before the campaign, Ma Long sought out around 3,000 strong men who were able to draw bows that were four juns (approx. 26 kilograms) and use 'waist-spun crossbows' (腰引弩) that were 36 juns (approx. 238 kilograms). In the end, he was able to find 3,500 men, and he had them practice their accuracy by shooting targets. Ma Long then requested and received fresh military supplies that would last him up to three years.

Ma Long's tactics 
In November 279, Ma Long set out west to fight the rebels. After the Jin troops crossed the Wen River (溫水; east of present-day Jingyuan County, Gansu), Shujineng responded by having tens of thousands of his rebels occupy the passes to block Ma Long's front, while the others set up ambushes to intercept his rear. 

During his battles with Shujineng, Ma Long employed a number of unorthodox tactics. In accordance to Zhuge Liang's 'Eightfold Battle Formations' (八陣圖), Ma Long decided to build ‘flat box carts’ (偏箱車; a cart with a board on one side which acts like a shield) for his soldiers to use. When fighting in the open, he would employ 'deer-antlered carts' (鹿角車; a cart with spears or halberds on the front shaped like antlers), and when passing through the narrow roads, he would build wooden roofs over the carts. Ma Long's soldiers were able to move while fighting, and the enemy arrows were unable to hit them. More questionably, another tactic that Ma Long allegedly used was placing down large amounts of 'magnetic stones' on the ground to slow down the enemy advances, the reason being that the rebels and their horses often wore iron armor while Ma Long's men wore armor made of rhinocerous hides. The rebels were taken by surprise and thought Ma Long and his soldiers were divine beings.

End of the rebellion 
While Ma Long fought in the west, a rumour began circulating in the court that he and his men had been cut off, but it was quickly dispelled after his messenger arrived at the court. Emperor Wu was pleased with Ma Long and further appointed him General Who Exhibits Might. As Ma Long marched to Wuwei, his troops killed and injured many of the rebels. After reaching Wuwei, Shujineng's allied chieftains, Cubahan (猝跋韓) and Zuwanneng (且萬能), surrendered to him along with ten thousand troops under them. In December 279, Ma Long, with the help of Meiguneng (沒骨能) and other friendly tribal leaders, won a great battle over Shujineng and killed him. Another account states that after Shujineng was defeated, he was assassinated by his subordinates, who then submitted to Ma Long. Tufa Shujineng's rebellion was at its end.

Aftermath 
As Shujineng's defeat became assured, Emperor Wu began his conquest of Wu one month before the rebellion was quelled, and Jin would unify China in May 280. Shujineng's cousin, Tufa Wuwan (禿髮務丸), was installed as the new chieftain of the Tufa-Xianbei tribe. For the remainder of Emperor Wu's reign, no similar revolt would break out in the northwest. However, in 296, due to poor governance, the tribal people, led by the Di chieftain, Qi Wannian, would once again rebel in the Guanzhong region, this time with more dire consequences that would contribute to the Upheaval of the Five Barbarians at the start of the 4th-century. Jia Nanfeng and Sima Zhong's marriage, prompted by Shujineng's rebellion, would also lay the seeds for the War of the Eight Princes.

References 

 Fang, Xuanling (ed.) (648). Book of Jin (Jin Shu).
 Sima, Guang (1084). Zizhi Tongjian.
 Shen, Yue (493 ). Book of Song (Song Shu).

270s conflicts
Campaigns of the Three Kingdoms
3rd-century rebellions
Rebellions in China